Indonesia's thirty-four provinces (including five with special status) are divided into 514 second-level administrative divisions (daerah tingkat II) - comprising 416 regencies (kabupaten in Indonesian) and 98 cities (kota) which are independent of the regencies in which they are geographically situated. As at the 2020 Census, these 514 second-level entitles are together sub-divided into 7,230 administrative districts (kecamatan). Since 2013, there has been a moratorium on the creation of additional provinces, regencies and independent cities, although proposals for new provinces and second-level divisions have been debated by the Indonesian parliament.

At the 2020 Census, the 416 regencies comprise twelve with populations of more than two million inhabitants each, fifty-one with populations of between one and two millions each, fifty-six with populations of between a half million and a million each, and 297 regencies with populations of under one half million each. Below is a list of Indonesia's 119 most populous regencies (those with more than 500,000 inhabitants at the 2020 Census) with the province in which they are located, and their populations at the 2010 and 2020 Censuses; they are ranked according to their 2020 population. Populations in 2010 and in 2020 are official data from the 2010 Census and the 2020 Census, as released by Badan Pusat Statistik or the Indonesian Central Statistics Agency.

Regencies by population

See also
List of Indonesian cities by population
List of regencies and cities of Indonesia by province

References

Regencies by population